The Goethe Medal, also known as the Goethe-Medaille, is a yearly prize given by the Goethe-Institut honoring non-Germans "who have performed outstanding service for the German language and for international cultural relations". It is an official decoration of the Federal Republic of Germany. The prize used to be given on 22 March, the anniversary of Goethe's death. Since 2009, it has been given on 28 August, the anniversary of Goethe's birth. The first awards were made in 1955. In the intervening years, through 2018, a total of 348 women and men from 65 countries have been so honored. It is not to be confused with Goethe-Medaille für Kunst und Wissenschaft (1932–1944) and Goetheplakette der Stadt Frankfurt am Main.

Recent recipients
The recent recipients are:

2021 
 Marilyn Douala Bell, Socio-economist 
 Toshio Hosokawa, Composer
 Wen Hui, Choreographer

2020 

 Zukiswa Wanner, Writer, publisher and curator
 Ian McEwan, Author
 Elvira Espejo Ayca, Artist and museum director

2019 
 Enkhbat Roozon, Publisher, bookseller and political journalist
 Shirin Neshat, Artist and filmmaker
 Doğan Akhanlı, freelance author of novels and essays in Turkish, and a play in German

2018 
 Heidi Abderhalden and Rolf Abderhalden (Mapa Teatro), Colombian theater maker
 Claudia Andujar, Brazilian photographer and activist
 Péter Eötvös, Hungarian composer and conductor

2017 
 Urvashi Butalia, Indian feminist and historian
 Emily Nasrallah, Lebanese writer
 Irina Shcherbakova, Russian historian and journalist

2016 
 Akinbode Akinbiyi, British-Nigerian photographer
 Yurii Andrukhovych, Ukrainian writer and translator
 David Lordkipanidze, Georgian anthropologist and archaeologist

2015 
 Sadiq Jalal al-Azm, Syrian philosopher and writer
 Neil MacGregor, British art historian and former museum director
 Eva Sopher, German-Brazilian cultural entrepreneur

2014 
 Krystyna Meissner, Polish director
 Robert Wilson, American director and playwright
 Gerard Mortier, (posthumously) Belgian opera director

2013 
 S. Mahmoud Hosseini Zad, Persian translator of German literature.
 Naveen Kishore, publisher of Seagull Books.
 Petros Markaris, Greek novelist.

2012 
 Irena Veisaitė
 Bolat Atabayev
 Dževad Karahasan, Bosnian writer

2011
John le Carré
Adam Michnik
Ariane Mnouchkine

2010 
 Ágnes Heller, Hungarian philosopher
 Fuad Rifka
 John Spalek

2009 
 Lars Gustafsson
 Victor Scoradet
 Sverre Dahl

2008 
Gholam Dastgir Behbud
Bernard Sobel
John E. Woods

2007 
 Daniel Barenboim
 Dezső Tandori
 Kim Min-ki

2006 
 Vera San Payo de Lemos
 Giwi Margwelaschwili
 Said

2005 
 Samuel Assefa
 Ruth Klüger
 Dmytro Zatonsky
 Yoko Tawada
 Simone Young

2004 
 Mohan Agashe
 Kevin Willie
 Imre Kertész
 Paul Michael Lützeler
 Anatoli A. Michailow
 Sergio Paulo Rouanet

2003 
 Lenka Reinerová
 Jorge Semprún

2002 
 Werner Michael Blumenthal
 Georges-Arthur Goldschmidt
 Francisek Grucza
 Touradj Rahnema
 Antonio Skármeta

2001 
 Adonis
 Sofia Gubaidulina
 Gerardo Marotta
 Werner Spies

2000 
 Nicholas Boyle
 György Konrád
 Daniel Libeskind
 Sara Sayin
 George Tabori
 Abdel-Ghaffar Mikkawy

Other notable recipients 
20th century recipients are:
1961: :fr:Robert Minder
1963: :pl:Marian Szyrocki
1967: Peter Jørgensen
1968: Gertrud Seidmann
1969: :nl:Cornelis Soeteman
1970: Pierre Bertaux
1973: Chetana Nagavajara 
1976: Pierre-Paul Sagave, Elichi Kikuchi, Waichi Sakurai, John Asher, Ingerid Dal
1982: Ekrem Akurgal, :de:Werner Kraft
1983: Bruno Bettelheim
1985: Alokeranjan Dasgupta, Johannes Edfelt
1987: Gordon A. Craig, Pierre Boulez, Pavica Mrazović
1988: George Mosse, Pierre Bourdieu, Giorgio Strehler
1989: Ernst Gombrich
1990: György Ligeti, Thomas Messer, :pl:Hubert Orłowski, Eda Sagarra, Hilde Spiel
1991: Leslie Bodi, Jan Hoet, Panagiotis Kondylis, Eduardo Paolozzi, Hans Sahl
1992: Elisabeth Augustin, Karl Raimund Popper, :cs:Hugo Rokyta
1993: Michel Tournier
1994: István Szabó, Billy Wilder
1995: Isang Yun, Hermann von der Dunk
1996: Jan Křen
1997: Nam June Paik, Rolf Liebermann
1998: Ralf Dahrendorf
1999: Dani Karavan, Leoluca Orlando, Jiří Gruša

References

External links 
 of The Goethe-Medal

Awards established in 1955
German awards
Johann Wolfgang von Goethe
1955 establishments in West Germany
Goethe-Institut